A list of head coaches of the Montreal Maroons:

 Cecil Hart 1924-1925
 Eddie Gerard 1925–1929
 Dunc Munro 1929–1930
 Dunc Munro and George "Buck" Boucher 1930–31
 Sprague Cleghorn 1931–1932
 Eddie Gerard 1932–1934
 Tommy Gorman 1934–1937
 King Clancy and Tommy Gorman 1937–38

References
 

Montreal Maroons head coaches
head coaches